The 4 Cats is a Lebanese band made up of four female singers. The 4 Cats was the first all-female Lebanese pop group. Their debut studio album Tick Tick remained at number one on Arabic top charts for more than four months and more than one million copies of it were sold. The members in the band have changed frequently and until today (2016).

Career

1998–2001: Formation, debut album, new members 
The group was formed by Ghassan Rahbani in 1998 after noticing that that the Arab world lacked such a kind of bands. He chose four girls to form the group that were Rola Bahnam, Dalida Chammai, Zeina Leyon and Chantal Kayssar. Their songs are mostly composed by Elias Rahbani but re-mastered into modern versions. They released their debut single "A’chra, Hda’ch, Tna’ch (10, 11, 12)" alongside a music video, the song was the lead single from their debut studio album Tick Tick. Later, Rola left the group due to family issues, and was replaced by Nicole Saba and continued working on their first album. The second and third singles of the album titled "Ya Nassini" and "Kan El Zaman" were released. They'd also go on tour in the Arab world, as well as the United Kingdom.

Following the release of their debut album, Chantal Kayssar left the group after her marriage to Elie Nakouzi and was replaced by Perla Chalala. In summer 2000, they released the lead single "Layl Nhar" of their second studio album of the same name, the choreography and dance for the music video were made by Kimberley Morrow who appeared in Will Smith's music video for  "Wild Wild West". The final single "Ma Ba'a Eida" was released in winter 2000. In October 2001, the girls were supposed to release a new album, however, the released date was changed after Nicole, Perla and Zeina left the group.

2002–2005: Tal Intizari, Ya Antar and El Dinyi Heyk 
In early 2002, three new girls has joined the group that were Maya Diab, Nesreen Zreik and Nathalie Barakat, replacing Nicole, Perla and Zeina. They released their third album Tal Intizari, with the lead single of the same name, and the second single "Rah Hebbak Aatool". The music video for the second single was released in 2003, just after Nathalie left the group, but it included a new girl, Rana, who performed Nathalie's part. Shortly after, Rana and Nesreen left the group, then, Perla came back but didn't continue, so she was replaced by a new member, Joyce.

In 2004, Dalida's sister, Raya, joined the group. Maya, Dalida, Raya and Joyce signed a contract with Rotana and released their first single with them entitled "Amelli Antar". And they also released their fourth studio album titled Ya Antar. They'd also released a music video for "Mashi Al Taffnes". After that, Dalida and Ghassan got married and they invited all the previous members of the band to the wedding. At the end of 2004, the group released a single titled "Nehna Mnesrouk", which was a single from their fifth album, El Dinyi Heyk. The title track's music video was released in 2005. After the released of that album, Joyce left the group and was replaced by Aline Ourfalian.

2007–2011: 4 Cats and a Lion, last album and new line-up 
Before the release of their sixth album, it was announced that Dalida gave birth to twins, so she had to leave the group, she would be later replaced by Eliana Abi Daher. In June 2007, they released their sixth and final studio album titled Wallat Kteer, and the title track received a music video as well. In October 2007, they made their acting debut in a movie called 4 Cats and a Lion, which starred Egyptian actor Hany Ramzi and many more. In 2009, only Maya appeared in a TV show called Kalam Neswan (Ladies Talk). In 2010, Maya left the group to start her solo career.

In early 2011, the group was dissolved after Maya left the group, but Aline continued with three new girls that are Moryal Ghanim, Reen Ashkar and Kristen A'akl. They released a music video for "Shouq Al Ayam" from their 2004 album, Ya Antar, however, It failed to attract viewership and sponsors and later released another low budget video of their multi-track medley.

Discography

Studio albums 
 Tick Tick (1998)
 Layl Nhar (2000)
 Tal Intizari (2002)
 Ya Antar (2004)
 El Dinyi Heik (2005)
 Wallat Kteer (2007)

Compilation albums 

 Best of 4 Cats Vol.2
 Best of 4 Cats Vol.3

Singles

References

External links
 4 Cats Discography and Music

Lebanese musicians
Girl groups
Lebanese pop music groups
Lebanese women singers